Glen Campbell: I'll Be Me is the soundtrack to the 2014 American documentary film of the same name based on the life of country music singer Glen Campbell. An extended play consisted of five songs was released by Big Machine Records was released on October 17, 2014, in anticipation of the film's theatrical release, and was followed by a full soundtrack featuring 10 songs, which also includes tracks from the extended play, released on October 31.

Prior to the soundtrack release, three of the songs were released as singles. The Band Perry's rendition of "Gentle on My Mind" and Campbell's last studio recording of "I'm Not Gonna Miss You" were released on the same date, September 29, whereas "Remembering" sung by Ashley Campbell, was released in late-2015, after the soundtrack releases. At the 57th Grammy Awards, the first two songs, won awards for Best Country Song and Best Country Duo/Group Performance, while at the 58th Grammy Awards, the soundtrack won the Grammy Award for Best Compilation Soundtrack for Visual Media. The song "I'm Not Gonna Miss You" received nominations at various ceremonies, including the Academy Award for Best Original Song.

The album debuted at number 147 on Billboard 200, and peaked at number 103, the following week. It also topped the Soundtracks chart and on Top Country Albums, and also sold a total of 23,100 copies .

Release

Singles 
On September 8, 2014, Campbell at a press release stated that, he would record his last song titled "I'm Not Gonna Miss You" which will be released on September 29. Its music video was released on October 12. The Band Perry's rendition of "Gentle on My Mind" from the soundtrack was released as another single on the same date as the first track released, and performed the track at the Country Music Association awards broadcast on November 5, 2014. "Remembering", sung by  Campbell's daughter Ashley Campbell, was released as a single on June 25, 2015.

Albums 
The extended play of the soundtrack consisted of five songs and was released on October 17, 2014, a week prior to the theatrical release. The full soundtrack was released on October 31. A vinyl edition of the album was released on May 1, 2015.

Track listing

Personnel 
Credits adapted from Allmusic
 Production

 Glen Campbell – composer, songwriter, primary artist
 Julian Raymond – album producer, songwriter
 Dann Huff – album producer
 John Hartford – songwriter
 Ashley Campbell – songwriter, primary artist
 Kai Welch – songwriter
 Jesse D. Hodges – songwriter
 Larry Rintye – songwriter
 Jimmy Webb – songwriter
 Jeff Pollack – music supervisor
 Seth Morton – recording, mixing
 Howard Willing – recording, mixing
 Steve Marcantonio – recording, mixing
 Hana Ali – recording
 Juliette Amoroso – recording
 Drew Bollman – mixing
 Justin Niebank – mixing
 Hank Williams – mastering
 Sean Neff – music editing
 James Keach – executive producer
 Trevor Albert – executive producer
 Scott Borchetta – executive producer
 Alicia Matthews – music co-ordinator
 Laurel Kittleson – music co-ordinator
 LeAnn Bennett – music co-ordinator
 Mike Griffith – music co-ordinator
 Sarah Boddie – music co-ordinator

 Backing vocalists

 Ryan Jarred
 Ashley Campbell
 Julian Raymond
 Cal Campbell
 TJ Kuenster
 Shannon Campbell

 Musicians

 Danny Rader – acoustic guitar
 Ryan Jarred – acoustic guitar
 Ashley Campbell – acoustic guitar, banjo, keyboards
 Ilya Toshinskiy – acoustic guitar, bass
 Jerry McPherson – acoustic guitar, electric guitar
 Glen Campbell – acoustic guitar, electric guitar
 Mac McAnally – acoustic guitar
 Tim Pierce – acoustic guitar
 Julian Raymond – bass
 Siggy Sjursen – bass
 Joe Osborne – bass
 Mike Brignardello – bass
 Jimmie Lee Sloas – bass
 Reid Perry – bass
 Aaron Sterling – bass, drums
 Nat Smith – cello
 Will Carter – dobro
 Cal Campbell – drums
 Chad Cromwell – drums
 Hal Blaine – drums
 Chad Cromwell – drums
 Dann Huff – electric guitar, dobro, piano
 Mike Ward – electric guitar
 Charlie Judge – keyboard, synth, accordion
 Bennett Salvay – keyboard
 Zac Rae – keyboard
 Tim Lauer – keyboard
 Neil Perry – mandolin
 Don Randi – piano
 Dan Dugmore – steel guitar
 Paul Franklin – steel guitar

Charts

Accolades

Notes

References 

2014 soundtrack albums
2014 EPs
Big Machine Records EPs
Big Machine Records soundtracks
Glen Campbell soundtracks
Country music soundtracks